is a Japanese kickboxer, currently competing in the bantamweight division of RISE. He is the current RISE Bantamweight Champion, having held the title since 2018.

As of October 2022, he is ranked as the best flyweight (-56.7kg) kickboxer in the world by Combat Press and the best super flyweight (-55kg) kickboxer by Beyond Kick. Between October 2019 and August 2020, he was ranked in the strawweight top ten by Combat Press, and as a top ten flyweight since September 2020.

Kickboxing career

DEEP KICK

Early career
Suzuki made his professional debut against Shohei Morishita at DEEP☆KICK 15 on May 12, 2013. He won the fight by a first-round technical knockout, as he needed just 17 seconds to force a referee stoppage. Suzuki was booked to face Ryusei Narukawa at DEEP☆KICK 16 on July 14, 2013, in his second professional appearance. He won the fight by a narrowly contested unanimous decision, with all three judges scoring the bout 30–29 in his favor.

Suzuki moved up from -53 to -55 kg for his next fight, a bout with Yuji at DEEP☆KICK 17 on September 22, 2013. He won the fight by a third-round knockout. These three victories earned Suzuki a #6 ranking in the DEEP KICK -55kg division, as well as a fight with the #4 ranked  contender Yoshiki Nakagawa at DEEP☆KICK 18 on December 15, 2013. He won the fight by unanimous decision, with scores of 30–29, 30–29 and 30–28.

After amassing a four-fight winning streak, Suzuki was placed in the 2014 DEEP KICK -55kg Next Challenger tournament, held to determine the next challenger for the divisional kingpin Kazuki Tanaka. Suzuki faced Yuji in the semifinals, held on DEEP☆KICK 20 on April 27, 2014. He won the rematch with Yuji by a first-round technical knockout. He advanced to the tournament finals, held at DEEP☆KICK 21 on July 20, 2014, where he faced Yoshiki Nakagawa. The fight was ruled a majority decision draw after the first three rounds, with two judges scoring it an event 30–30 and 29–29 draw, while the third judge scored it 30–29 for Suzuki. Suzuki was awarded a split decision after an extra fourth round was contested.

DEEP KICK champion
The 17-year old Suzuki was booked to challenge Kazuki Tanaka for the DEEP KICK -55kg championship at DEEP☆KICK 22 on September 28, 2014, in what was Tanaka's first title defense. He captured his first professional piece of silverware with a third-round technical knockout of Tanaka. He knocked Tanaka down once prior to the stoppage, with a right hook in the first round.

Suzuki took part in the REBELS -55kg tournament, organized to crown the new champion, and was scheduled to face Masahide Kudo in the semifinals at REBELS.33 on January 25, 2015. He lost the fight by split decision, after an extra fourth round was fought. Suzuki next faced Wataru Yamato at NJKF 2015 2nd on April 5, 2015. He lost the fight by majority decision, with scores of 30–28, 30–27 and 28–28. Despite suffering two consecutive losses, Suzuki was nonetheless scheduled to face the future pound for pound great Tenshin Nasukawa in the quarterfinals of the BLADE -55kg tournament on August 1, 2015. He was twice knocked down in the first two minutes of the opening round, which resulted in an automatic technical knockout loss for him.

Suzuki made his first DEEP KICK -55kg title defense against Unao Hatomune at DEEP☆KICK 28 on December 23, 2015. He won the fight by a second-round technical knockout, successfully snapping his three-fight losing streak.

Rise up the ranks

Winning the Innovation title
Suzuki faced the NKB bantamweight champion Ryo Takahashi in a non-title bout at HOOST CUP KINGS ROAD on March 20, 2016. He won the fight by a majority decision, with two scorecards of 30–29 and one even scorecard of 29–29. Suzuki next challenged David Chibana for the INNOVATION Bantamweight (-55kg) championship at JAPAN KICKBOXING INNOVATION Join Forces-1 on June 5, 2016, in what was Chibana's first title defense. He won the fight by a second-round technical knockout.

Suzuki next fought in two more non-title bouts. Suzuki first faced Shuto Miyazaki at DEEP☆KICK 30 on July 17, 2016. He knocked Miyazaki down with a knee at the 2:08 minute mark of the opening round. Although his opponent was able to beat the count, he was unsteady on his feet, prompting the referee to wave the bout off. In his second non-title bout, Suzuki faced Takeshi Katsuoka at JAPAN KICKBOXING INNOVATION Join Forces-3 on September 25, 2016. He won the fight by unanimous decision, with all three judges scoring the bout 30–27 in his favor.

Winning the WBC Muay thai title
Suzuki faced the WPMF interim and WMC World bantamweight champion Takaaki Hayashi for the vacant WBC Muay Thai Japan -55kg championship at NJKF 2016 7th ～NJKF20th Anniversary on November 27, 2016. He won the fight by a first-round knockout, flooring Hayashi with a left hook in the final minute of the opening round.

Suzuki made his second DEEP KICK -55kg title defense against Kazuma Sasaki at DEEP☆KICK 32 on April 9, 2017. He retained the title by a second-round technical knockout. Suzuki made his first WBC Muay Thai  Japan -55kg title defense against Takuma Oota at JAPAN KICKBOXING INNOVATION Champions Carnival 2017 II on June 25, 2017. He won the fight by unanimous decision, with scores of 49–47, 49–48 and 49–48.

Winning the HOOST CUP title
Suzuki challenged the HOOST CUP and MA Japan Bantamweight (-55kg) champion KING Kyosuke for his HOOST CUP championship at HOOST CUP KINGS OSAKA 2 on November 26, 2017. He captured the title by unanimous decision, with all three judges scoring the bout 30–28 in his favor.

Suzuki faced the MA Japan Super bantamweight champion Masaki Takeuchi in a non-title bout at KNOCK OUT Sakura Burst on April 14, 2018. He won the fight by a second-round technical knockout, after knocking Takeuchi down thrice by the 1:14 minute mark of the round.

RISE

Bantamweight tournament
Suzuki made his RISE promotional debut against Rasta Kido at RISE 126, in the quarterfinals of the RISE bantamweight (-55kg) tournament, on July 16, 2018. He won the fight by unanimous decision, with all three judges awarding him a 30–28 scorecard. Suzuki was expected to face Yugo Flyskygym in the penultimate bout of the tournament at RISE 127 on September 16, 2018. The bout was later cancelled, as Yugo suffered from severe dehydration during his weight cut and was rushed to the hospital for treatment and observation. 

Suzuki was given a bye and faced Yuki Masato for the vacant RISE Bantamweight championship at RISE 129 on November 17, 2018. He won the fight by a third-round technical knockout. Suzuki twice knocked Masato down in the second round, but times with a right straight, but was unable to finish him. The referee finally waved the bout off at the 1:15 minute mark of the very next round, as Suzuki landed a number of punches on an unresponsive Masato.

Bantamweight title reign
Suzuki faced Duk Jae Yoon in a non-title bout at RISE World Series 2019: First Round on March 10, 2019. He needed just 92 seconds to win the fight by technical knockout. Suzuki made his first WBC Muay Thai Japan title defense against Shun YAMATO at NJKF Border Kickboxing on May 12, 2019. He retained the title by a fourth-round technical knockout.

Suzuki faced Emanuele Tetti Menichelli in a non-title bout at Rise World Series 2019 on July 21, 2019. He won the fight by a second-round knockout, stopping Menichelli with a left hook to the body. Suzuki fought another non-title bout against the RISE Super Flyweight (-53 kg) champion Toki Tamaru at Rise World Series 2019 Final Round on September 16, 2019. The fight was ruled a majority decision draw after the first three rounds were contested, with two judges scoring it an even 29–29 draw and one judge scoring it 30–29 for Tamaru. Suzuki was awarded a unanimous decision after an extension round was fought.

Suzuki made his first RISE title defense against Rasta Kido at RISE 136 on January 13, 2020. They previously faced each other in the quarterfinals of the RISE bantamweight tournament on July 16, 2018, with Suzuki winning by unanimous decision. He was more convincing in the rematch, dropping Rasta with a right straight in the fourth round for a stoppage victory.

Dead or Alive tournament
Suzuki faced the former two-weight Lumpinee Stadium champion Visanlek Meibukai in a non-title bout at Rise on Abema on July 12, 2020. The event was held in an empty arena, as no fans were allowed to attend due to measures imposed to combat the COVID-19 pandemic. He won the fight by a third-round technical knockout.

On September 12, it was announced that Suzuki would be one of four participants in the 2020 RISE "Dead or Alive" one-day tournament, held to determine the next opponent for Tenshin Nasukawa. Aside from a bout with the pound for pound great, the winner was also set to receive a ¥5,000,000 prize. Suzuki was scheduled to face Rui Ebata in the semifinals, at RISE DEAD OR ALIVE 2020 Osaka on November 1, 2020. Suzuki won the fight by unanimous decision, with three scorecards of 30–28. The bout was later named as "Fight of the Year" by Combat Press. Suzuki advanced to the tournament finals, where he faced last year's RISE -58kg World Series runner-up Shiro. He lost the fight by a dominant unanimous decision, as all three judges scored every round of the bout for Shiro.

Continued title reign
Suzuki faced Soma Tameda at RISE Eldorado 2021 on February 28, 2021. He won the fight by a first-round knockout. Suzuki was booked to face Tepparith Joe Gym at RISE WORLD SERIES 2021 on July 18, 2021. He won the fight by unanimous decision, with scores of 30–28, 30–28 and 29–29.

Suzuki fought a rematch with Tenshin Nasukawa at RISE WORLD SERIES 2021 Yokohama on September 23, 2021, in Nasukawa's second-to-last fight with the promotion. He lost by unanimous decision. Suzuki fought another rematch two months later, as he was booked to face Rui Ebata at RISE World Series 2021 Osaka 2 on November 14, 2021. He won the fight by a first-round knockout, flooring Ebata with a right cross just past the midway point of the opening round.

Suzuki was booked to make his second RISE bantamweight title defense against Kengo at RISE 154 on January 23, 2022. He won the fight by a first-round technical knockout. Suzuki was next booked to face  Mutsuki Ebata at RISE El Dorado 2022 on April 2, 2022. He won the fight by unanimous decision after scoring a knockdown in the second round.

Suzuki faced the reigning K-1 World GP Super Bantamweight champion Akihiro Kaneko at The Match 2022 on June 19, 2022. The bout was scheduled for the undercard of The Match 2022, headlined by Takeru Segawa and Tenshin Nasukawa. He won the fight by majority decision, with scores of 30–28, 30–29 and 29–29.

Suzuki faced the former Shootboxing super bantamweight champion Seiki Ueyama at RISE WORLD SERIES 2022 Osaka on August 21, 2022. He won the fight by unanimous decision, after an extra fourth round was contested.

Suzuki faced the former ISKA World Bantamweight champion and the 2020 RISE Dead or Alive tournament winner Shiro at RISE WORLD SERIES / SHOOTBOXING-KINGS	on December 25, 2022. He lost the fight by majority decision, with scores of 30–29, 30–29 and 29–29.

Suzuki faced the two-time K-1 World Super bantamweight Grand Prix runner-up Masashi Kumura at K-1 World GP 2023: K'Festa 6 on March 12, 2023. He lost the fight by unanimous decision, with all three judges scoring the bout 30–28 for Kumura. Suzuki was knocked down by a jab early in the second round, which proved to be the pivotal moment of the bout, as the other two rounds were scored as a draw.

Titles and accomplishments

Professional
RISE
 2018 RISE Bantamweight Championship
Two successful title defenses

 HOOST CUP
 2017 HOOST CUP Japan Bantamweight Championship

World Boxing Council Muaythai
 2016 WBC Muay Thai Japan Bantamweight Championship
Two successful title defenses

 DEEP KICK
 2014 DEEP KICK -55kg Next Challenger Tournament Winner
 2014 DEEP KICK -55kg Championship
 Two successful title defenses

 JAPAN KICKBOXING INNOVATION
 2016 INNOVATION Bantamweight Championship

Amateur
DEEP KICK
2011 TOP RUN -50 Champion
2010 TOP RUN -45 kg Champion

Awards
 2020 Combat Press Fight of the Year (vs Rui Ebata)

Kickboxing record

|- style="background:#fbb;"
| 2023-03-12 || Loss ||align=left| Masashi Kumura || K-1 World GP 2023: K'Festa 6 || Tokyo, Japan || Decision (Unanimous)|| 3 ||3:00 
|-  style="background:#fbb;"
| 2022-12-25|| Loss ||align=left| Shiro || RISE WORLD SERIES / SHOOTBOXING-KINGS|| Tokyo, Japan || Decision (Majority) || 3 || 3:00
|-  style="background:#cfc;"
| 2022-08-21|| Win ||align=left| Seiki Ueyama|| RISE WORLD SERIES 2022 Osaka || Osaka, Japan || Ext.R Decision (Unanimous)|| 4 || 3:00 
|-  style="text-align:center; background:#cfc"
| 2022-06-19 || Win||align=left| Akihiro Kaneko || THE MATCH 2022 || Tokyo, Japan || Decision (Majority)|| 3 ||3:00
|-  style="text-align:center; background:#cfc"
| 2022-04-02 || Win||align=left| Mutsuki Ebata || RISE El Dorado 2022 || Tokyo, Japan || Decision (Unanimous) || 3 || 3:00
|-  style="background:#cfc;"
| 2022-01-23|| Win ||align=left| Kengo || RISE 154 || Tokyo, Japan || TKO (Punches) || 1 || 2:04 
|-
! style=background:white colspan=9 |

|-  style="text-align:center; background:#cfc"
| 2021-11-14 || Win || align=left| Rui Ebata || RISE World Series 2021 Osaka 2 || Osaka, Japan || KO (Right Cross)|| 1 || 1:49
|-  style="background:#fbb;"
| 2021-09-23|| Loss ||align=left| Tenshin Nasukawa || RISE WORLD SERIES 2021 Yokohama || Yokohama, Japan || Decision (Unanimous) || 3 ||3:00
|-  style="background:#cfc;"
| 2021-07-18|| Win ||align=left| Tepparith Joe Gym || RISE WORLD SERIES 2021 Osaka|| Osaka, Japan || Decision (Unanimous) || 3 ||3:00
|-  style="background:#cfc;"
| 2021-02-28 || Win || align=left| Soma Tameda || RISE Eldorado 2021 || Yokohama, Japan || KO (Right Cross)  || 1 || 1:14
|-  style="background:#fbb;"
| 2020-11-01|| Loss ||align=left| Shiro || RISE DEAD OR ALIVE 2020 Osaka, Final||  Osaka, Japan || Decision (Unanimous) || 3 ||3:00
|-
! style=background:white colspan=9 |
|-  style="background:#cfc;"
| 2020-11-01|| Win ||align=left| Rui Ebata || RISE DEAD OR ALIVE 2020 Osaka, Semi Final||  Osaka, Japan || Decision (Unanimous) || 3 ||3:00
|-  style="background:#cfc;"
| 2020-07-12|| Win ||align=left| Visanlek Meibukai || Rise on Abema || Tokyo, Japan || TKO (Punches) || 3 || 0:47
|-  style="background:#cfc;"
| 2020-01-13|| Win ||align=left| Rasta || RISE 136 || Tokyo, Japan || KO (Straight Right) || 4 || 2:49 
|-
! style=background:white colspan=9 |
|-  style="background:#CCFFCC;"
| 2019-09-16||Win ||align=left| Toki Tamaru || Rise World Series 2019 Final Round || Chiba, Japan ||Ext.R Decision (Unanimous) || 4 ||3:00
|-  style="background:#CCFFCC;"
| 2019-07-21|| Win ||align=left| Emanuele Tetti Menichelli || Rise World Series 2019 || Osaka, Japan || KO (Left Hook to the Body) || 2 || 1:30
|-  style="background:#CCFFCC;"
| 2019-05-12|| Win ||align=left| Shun YAMATO || NJKF Border Kickboxing || Osaka, Japan || KO (Punches) || 4 || 1:32
|-
! style=background:white colspan=9 |
|-  style="background:#CCFFCC;"
| 2019-03-10|| Win ||align=left| Duk Jae Yoon || RISE World Series 2019: First Round || Ota, Japan || TKO (Referee Stoppage) || 1 || 1:32
|-  style="background:#CCFFCC;"
| 2018-11-17|| Win ||align=left| Yuki Masato || RISE 129, Tournament Final || Tokyo, Japan || TKO (Punches)|| 3 || 1:15
|-
! style=background:white colspan=9 |
|-  style="background:#CCFFCC;"
| 2018-07-16|| Win ||align=left| Rasta || RISE 126, Tournament Quarterfinals || Tokyo, Japan || Decision (Unanimous)|| 3 || 3:00
|-  style="background:#CCFFCC;"
| 2018-04-14|| Win ||align=left| Masaki Takeuchi || KNOCK OUT Sakura Burst || Kanagawa, Japan || TKO (3 Knockdowns) || 2 || 1:14
|-
|-  style="background:#CCFFCC;"
| 2017-11-26|| Win ||align=left| KING Kyosuke || HOOST CUP KINGS OSAKA 2 || Osaka, Japan || Decision (Unanimous) || 3 || 3:00
|-
! style=background:white colspan=9 |
|-  style="background:#CCFFCC;"
| 2017-06-25|| Win ||align=left| Takuma Oota || JAPAN KICKBOXING INNOVATION Champions Carnival 2017 II || Tokyo, Japan || Decision (Unanimous) || 5 || 3:00
|-
! style=background:white colspan=9 |
|-  style="background:#CCFFCC;"
| 2017-04-09|| Win ||align=left| Kazuma Sasaki || DEEP☆KICK 32 || Osaka, Japan || TKO (Punches) || 2 || 2:39
|-
! style=background:white colspan=9 |
|-  style="background:#CCFFCC;"
| 2016-11-27|| Win ||align=left| Takaaki Hayashi || NJKF 2016 7th ～NJKF20th Anniversary  || Tokyo, Japan || KO (Left Hook) || 1 || 2:13
|-
! style=background:white colspan=9 |
|-  style="background:#CCFFCC;"
| 2016-09-25|| Win ||align=left| Takeshi Katsuoka || JAPAN KICKBOXING INNOVATION Join Forces-3 || Tokyo, Japan || Decision (Unanimous) || 3 || 3:00
|-  style="background:#CCFFCC;"
| 2016-07-17|| Win ||align=left| Shuto Miyazaki || DEEP☆KICK 30 || Osaka, Japan || TKO || 1 || 2:08
|-  style="background:#CCFFCC;"
| 2016-06-05|| Win ||align=left| David Chibana|| JAPAN KICKBOXING INNOVATION Join Forces-1 || Tokyo, Japan || TKO (Referee Stoppage)|| 3 || 2:20
|-
! style=background:white colspan=9 |
|-  style="background:#CCFFCC;"
| 2016-03-20|| Win ||align=left| Ryo Takahashi || HOOST CUP KINGS ROAD || Kyoto, Japan || Decision (Majority)|| 3 || 3:00
|-  style="background:#CCFFCC;"
| 2015-12-23|| Win ||align=left| Unao Hatomune || DEEP☆KICK 28 || Osaka, Japan || TKO (Referee stoppage) || 2 || 2:09
|-
! style=background:white colspan=9 |
|-  style="background:#FFBBBB;"
| 2015-08-01|| Loss ||align=left| Tenshin Nasukawa || Blade.2 55kg 2015 Tournament, Quarter Finals|| Tokyo, Japan|| KO (Punches) || 1 || 1:31
|-  style="background:#FFBBBB;"
| 2015-04-05|| Loss ||align=left| Wataru Yamato || NJKF 2015 2nd || Osaka, Japan|| Decision (Majority) || 3 || 3:00
|-  style="background:#FFBBBB;"
| 2015-01-25|| Loss ||align=left| Masahide Kudo || REBELS.33, Tournament Semifinals || Tokyo, Japan|| Ext.R Decision (Split) || 4 || 3:00
|-  style="background:#CCFFCC;"
| 2014-09-28|| Win ||align=left| Kazuki Tanaka || DEEP☆KICK 22 || Osaka, Japan || TKO (Left Hook)|| 3 || 0:26
|-
! style=background:white colspan=9 |
|-
|-  style="background:#CCFFCC;"
| 2014-07-20|| Win ||align=left| Yoshiki Nakagawa || DEEP☆KICK 21, Tournament Finals || Osaka, Japan || Ext.R Decision (Split)|| 4 || 3:00
|-
! style=background:white colspan=9 |
|-
|-  style="background:#CCFFCC;"
| 2014-04-27|| Win ||align=left| Yuji || DEEP☆KICK 20, Tournament Semifinals || Osaka, Japan || TKO (Punches)|| 1 || 2:52
|-  style="background:#CCFFCC;"
| 2013-12-15|| Win ||align=left| Yoshiki Nakagawa || DEEP☆KICK 18 || Osaka, Japan || Decision (Unanimous) || 3 || 3:00
|-  style="background:#CCFFCC;"
| 2013-09-22|| Win ||align=left| Yuji || DEEP☆KICK 17 || Osaka, Japan || KO || 3 || 0:54
|-  style="background:#CCFFCC;"
| 2013-07-14|| Win ||align=left| Ryusei Narukawa || DEEP☆KICK 16 || Osaka, Japan || Decision (Unanimous) || 3 || 3:00
|-  style="background:#CCFFCC;"
| 2013-05-12|| Win ||align=left| Shohei Morishita || DEEP☆KICK 15 || Osaka, Japan || TKO (Referee stoppage) || 1 || 0:17
|-
| colspan=9 | Legend:    

|-  style="background:#FFBBBB;"
| 2013-03-17|| Loss||align=left| Shuhei Kumura || NJKF 2013 2nd || Osaka, Japan || Decision || 2 || 2:00
|-  style="background:#cfc;"
| 2013-02-10|| Win ||align=left| Hiroki Tsunada || Double Impact III || Osaka, Japan || KO || 2 || 1:36
|-  style="background:#FFBBBB;"
| 2012-07-08|| Loss||align=left| Ryusei Narukawa || DEEP☆KICK 12, Freshmans Tournament Semi Final || Osaka, Japan || Ext.R Decision (Split) || 3 || 2:00
|-  style="background:#cfc;"
| 2011-09-11|| Win ||align=left| Kaji Hayate || M-1 Freshmans vol.3|| Tokyo, Japan || Decision (Unanimous) || 3 || 2:00
|-  style="background:#cfc;"
| 2011-07-31|| Win ||align=left| Ryusei Narukawa || DEEP☆KICK 7|| Osaka, Japan || Decision (Unanimous) || 3 || 2:00
|-
! style=background:white colspan=9 |
|-  style="background:#cfc;"
| 2011-04-10|| Win ||align=left| Jin Aso || DEEP☆KICK 6|| Osaka, Japan || Decision (Majority) ||2 || 2:00
|-
! style=background:white colspan=9 |
|-  style="background:#cfc;"
| 2010-12-12|| Win ||align=left| Seiya Matsumoto || DEEP☆KICK 5|| Osaka, Japan || Decision (Unanimous) || 2 || 2:00
|-
! style=background:white colspan=9 |
|-
| colspan=9 | Legend:

See also
 List of male kickboxers

References

Living people
1997 births
Japanese male kickboxers
Flyweight kickboxers
Sportspeople from Osaka
People from Yao, Osaka
Kickboxing champions